Kampong Tanah Jambu is a village in the north-east of Brunei-Muara District, Brunei. The population was 8,809 in 2016. It encompasses the original village settlement, as well as the public housing areas STKRJ Kampong Tanah Jambu and RPN Kampong Tanah Jambu.

Geography 
Kampong Tanah Jambu is one of the villages in Mukim Mentiri, a mukim in Brunei-Muara District. It is one of the villages along Jalan Muara, a road which links Bandar Seri Begawan to Muara town.

Facilities

Mosque 
Kampong Tanah Jambu Mosque is the village mosque; it was inaugurated on 7 December 1979 and can accommodate 600 worshippers.

References 

Villages in Brunei-Muara District
Public housing estates in Brunei